Boniface Alexandre (born 31 July 1936) is a Haitian politician. Alexandre served as the provisional president of Haiti following the 2004 Haitian coup d'état that removed President Jean-Bertrand Aristide from office. He served until May 2006.

Life
Alexandre was raised by his uncle, Martial Célestin, Haiti's first prime minister. Trained as a lawyer, he worked for a law firm in Port-au-Prince for 25 years before being appointed to the Supreme Court in 1992. Aristide appointed him as Chief Justice of the Supreme Court of Haiti in 2002.

Alexandre, as the Chief Justice and therefore next in the presidential line of succession, assumed the office of president after the coup. During Alexandre's acting presidency, Amnesty International reported "excessive use of force by police officers", extrajudicial executions, a lack of investigations into these, escalation of "unlawful killings and kidnappings by illegal armed groups", failure of officials to prevent and punish violence against women, dysfunctionality of the justice system, and forty or more people imprisoned without charge or trial.

Alexandre left office on 14 May 2006, when René Préval, winner of the February 2006 presidential election, was sworn in as president.

See also
2004 Haitian coup d'état
Politics of Haïti

References

Presidents of Haiti
Haitian judges
1936 births
Living people
2000s in Haiti
21st-century Haitian politicians